Aceratium is a genus of about 20 species of trees and shrubs of eastern Malesia and Australasia from the family Elaeocarpaceae. In Australia they are commonly known as carabeens. They grow naturally in rainforests, as large shrubs to understorey trees and large trees.

They grow naturally in New Guinea, the centre of diversity, in New Britain, New Ireland, Vanuatu, Sulawesi, Moluccas, and in Australia, where botanists have formally described five species endemic to the Wet Tropics rainforests of northeastern Queensland.

Some species have uses for their fruits as food and, although not yet well known, some have popularity in cultivation, for example in Brisbane.

Selected species
 Aceratium archboldianum  – New Guinea
 Aceratium braithwaitei  – New Guinea
 Aceratium brassii  – New Guinea
 Aceratium concinnum  – Qld, Australia
 Aceratium doggrellii  – Qld, Australia
 Aceratium ferrugineum  – Qld, Australia
 Aceratium ledermannii  – New Guinea, New Britain
 Aceratium megalospermum  – Qld, Australia
 Aceratium muellerianum  – New Guinea 
 Aceratium oppositifolium  – Sulawesi, Moluccas, New Guinea region: Kai Islands through to the Santa Cruz group, New Britain, New Ireland, Solomon Islands
 Aceratium pachypetalum  – W New Guinea
 Aceratium parvifolium  – New Guinea
 Aceratium pittosporoides ; Syn: A. breviflorum  – New Guinea
 Aceratium sericeum  – W New Guinea
 Aceratium sericoleopsis  – Qld, Australia
 Aceratium sinuatum  – New Guinea
 Aceratium sphaerocarpum ; Syn: A. erythrocarpum  – New Guinea
 Aceratium tomentosum  – New Guinea

References

Elaeocarpaceae
Flora of Papua New Guinea
Flora of Queensland
Flora of Vanuatu
Flora of Malesia
Elaeocarpaceae genera